Maya Mountain is a small pyramidal mountain, about  high, between Aztec Mountain and Pyramid Mountain, just south of Taylor Glacier in Victoria Land, Antarctica. It was so named by the New Zealand Geological Survey Antarctic Expedition (1958–59) because its shape resembles the pyramidal ceremonial platforms used by the Maya civilization.

References

Mountains of Victoria Land
Scott Coast